Paweł Owerłło (15 September 1869 – 27 April 1957) was a Polish stage and film actor. He appeared in more than 45 films between 1912 and 1939.

Selected filmography
 The Unthinkable (1926)
Pan Tadeusz (1928)
 Pod banderą miłości (1929)
 Kult ciała (1930)
 Niebezpieczny romans (1930)
 Bezimienni bohaterowie (1932)
 Sound of the Desert (1932)
 Prokurator Alicja Horn (1933)
 Co mój mąż robi w nocy (1934)
 Młody Las (1934)
 Love, Cherish, Respect (1934)
 Rapsodia Bałtyku (1935)
 Second Youth (1938)
 Profesor Wilczur (1938)

References

External links

1869 births
1957 deaths
Polish male stage actors
Polish male film actors
Polish male silent film actors
20th-century Polish male actors
Male actors from Warsaw
People from Warsaw Governorate